Imad Khalili (born 3 April 1987) is a Swedish former professional footballer who played as a midfielder or a striker. He is the head coach of Hammarby TFF in Ettan, Sweden's third tier.

Club career

Breakthrough
At age five, Khalili began playing football at the local club Högaborgs BK. He made his senior debut for the side in 2002, aged 16, and attracted interest from several big clubs around Europe. He had a trial with the Scottish club Celtic FC but chose not to move abroad, on the advice of the Swedish international Henrik Larsson, who also had started his career at Högaborg.

Tired of the interest surrounding him, Khalili took a one and half-year break from playing football between the summer of 2003 and the beginning of 2005. He ultimately signed a three year-deal with Helsingborgs IF in Allsvenskan. However, he had a hard time establishing himself at the club, enjoying loan spells at both Randers FC in the Danish Superliga and Bunkeflo IF in Superettan during the upcoming seasons.

In December 2007, he joined IFK Norrköping on a permanent deal. The club had just won a promotion to Allsvenskan. The team struggled in the league play during the season of 2008 resulting in an immediate relegation to the second tier. Khalili would however establish himself as a key member of the squad during the following seasons, enjoying another promotion to Allsvenskan in 2010.

Top scorer
Between 2011 and 2013 he played as a regular in Allsvenskan for the club from the county of Östergötland, making 37 appearances whilst scoring 13 goals in the top tier. During the midseason of 2013 he attracted interest from his former club Helsingborgs IF, who completed the transfer of Khalili in August the same year.

He continued his impressive scoring form during the 2013 season at his new club, eventually being crowned as the top scorer of Allsvenskan with 15 goals in total.

Years abroad
Before the 2014 season, he attracted interest from abroad, signing a loan deal with Al-Shabab in Saudi Arabia. He enjoyed a successful stint at the club, scoring a spectacular soloist strike in a 2–1 win against Al-Nassr in March 2014.

He signed for Shanghai Dongya in the Chinese Super League during the summer of 2014 on a permanent deal. Khalili went on to make 9 appearances for the side, scoring twice, before being deemed surplus to requirements due to the international players policy in the league. He was subsequently released from his contract on 1 February 2015.

Soon after, he signed a short time-contract with Baniyas, returning to his birth country United Arab Emirates. He featured in 8 games for the club during the spring, scoring twice, before leaving on a free in May 2015.

Return to Sweden
On 7 July 2015, he signed a four and half-year contract with the Stockholm-based club Hammarby IF in Allsvenskan. There he reunited with his former manager at IFK Norrköping, Mats Jingblad – now the sporting director of Hammarby.

During the second half of 2015 and throughout the whole 2016 season, Khalili failed to impress then manager Nanne Bergstrand, subsequently only being used as a substitute player. He scored his first competitive goal for the club on 17 July 2016, in a 3–3 draw against Falkenbergs FF on home turf.

After only making five appearances midway through the 2017 season, under the reign of new manager Jakob Michelsen, Khalili went out on loan to Brommapojkarna. The six month-deal with the Superettan club was announced on 11 August 2017. He made his debut for the side only a few days later, coming on as a second half sub, in a 1–1 away draw against Varberg. Khalili ultimately made 7 appearances for Brommapojkarna, as they won promotion to Allsvenskan, but returned to Hammarby at the start of 2018.

In January 2018, Hammarby switched manager once again with Stefan Billborn taking over as head coach. Khalili received much playing time during the pre-season and scored in a Svenska Cupen 3–3 draw against GAIS on 25 February. Khalili began the league play as a starter and scored a brace in the third round, as Hammarby won 4–0 against his former club Brommapojkarna on 16 April. He ultimately finished the 2018 season with scoring three goals in 21 league games, as Hammarby finished 4th in the table.

On 20 February 2019, Khalili signed a one-year extension with Hammarby. He played 23 games during the campaign, scoring eight goals, as the club finished 3rd in Allsvenskan after eight straight wins at the end of the season.

In 2020, a season postponed due to the COVID-19 pandemic, Khalili mostly came on from the bench and played 22 games in total, scoring four league goals, as his side disappointedly finished 8th in the table.

On 14 April 2021, it was announced that Khalili would become an assistant coach at Hammarby, focusing on individual development in the squad, as well as still being eligible as a player for the rest of the year. On 30 May 2021, Khalili won the 2020–21 Svenska Cupen, the main domestic cup, with Hammarby IF through a 5–4 win on penalties (0–0 after full-time) against BK Häcken in the final.

International career
Imad Khalili won several caps for the Swedish under-17's, under-19's and under-21s in his younger days.

In 2014, he accepted an offer to play internationally for Palestine, but withdrew from the squad due to an injury. He was eligible to play for either Palestine, UAE or Sweden at senior level.

Coaching career
He worked as the assistant coach of Hammarby's senior squad in both 2021 and 2022, focused on the individual development of players. In early 2023, Khalili became the head coach of their feeder team Hammarby TFF in Ettan, Sweden's third tier.

Personal life
Khalili was born in Dubai, United Arab Emirates. His parents are Palestinians from Lebanon. At a young age, the family settled in the town of Helsingborg in southern Sweden.

He is the cousin of fellow professional footballer Abdul Khalili, who was part of the Sweden under-21 squad which won the 2015 European Championship. Another cousin, Moustafa Zeidan, previously played in the youth system at Aston Villa.

Career statistics

Club

Honours
Al-Shabab
 Kings Cup: 2014

IF Brommapojkarna
 Superettan: 2017

Hammarby IF
 Svenska Cupen: 2020–21

Individual
 Allsvenskan top scorer: 2013

References

External links
 

1987 births
Living people
Sportspeople from Dubai
Swedish footballers
Association football midfielders
Sweden youth international footballers
Sweden under-21 international footballers
Emirati footballers
Swedish people of Palestinian descent
Emirati people of Palestinian descent
Emirati emigrants to Sweden
Helsingborgs IF players
Randers FC players
IF Limhamn Bunkeflo (men) players
IFK Norrköping players
Hammarby Fotboll players
IF Brommapojkarna players
Al-Shabab FC (Riyadh) players
Shanghai Port F.C. players
Chinese Super League players
Baniyas Club players
Allsvenskan players
Superettan players
Saudi Professional League players
Högaborgs BK players
UAE Pro League players
Danish Superliga players
Swedish expatriate footballers
Swedish expatriate sportspeople in Saudi Arabia
Expatriate footballers in Saudi Arabia
Swedish expatriate sportspeople in China
Expatriate footballers in China
Swedish expatriate sportspeople in Denmark
Expatriate men's footballers in Denmark
Hammarby Fotboll non-playing staff